Sylvia Chant (24 December 1958 – 18 December 2019) was a British academic who was professor of Development Geography at the London School of Economics and Political Science and was co-director of the MSc Urbanisation and Development Programme in the LSE's Department of Geography and Environment.

Background
She earned her BA at King's College, Cambridge and her PhD at University College London in 1984 (Las Olvidadas: a study of women, housing and family structure in Queretaro, Mexico). Chant was a lecturer in Geography and Latin American Studies at the University of Liverpool from 1987 to 1988, before joining the LSE. She died after a battle with cancer in 2019.

Contributions
Gender and development research, particularly the 'feminisation of poverty', livelihoods and employment in urban areas. Working in Costa Rica, Mexico, the Philippines and The Gambia. In the Gambia she has also worked on resistance to female genital mutilation.

She is the editor of The International Handbook of Gender and Poverty : Concepts, Research, Policy (2010),

Awards
 Fellow, Royal Society of Arts (2011) 
 Fellow of the Academy of Social Science (2016)
 Leverhulme major research fellowship (2003-2006)
 Adlbertska Guest Professor of Sustainable Development, University of Gothenburg (2013-2015)

Publications
 Cities, Slums and Gender in the Global South: Towards a Feminised Urban Future (with Cathy McIlwaine) (Routledge, 2016)
 (ed.) The International Handbook of Gender and Poverty: Concepts, Research, Policy (Elgar, 2010).
 Geographies of Development in the 21st Century (with Cathy McIlwaine) (Elgar, 2009)
 Gender, Generation and Poverty: Exploring the 'Feminisation of Poverty' in Africa, Asia and Latin America (Elgar, 2007)
 Gender in Latin America (in association with Nikki Craske) (Latin America Bureau, 2003)
 Genero en Latinoamerica  in Latin America (in association with Nikki Craske) (Publicaciones de la Casa Chata, 2007)
 Mainstreaming Men in Gender and Development (with Matthew Gutmann) (Oxfam, 2000)
 Three Generations, Two Genders, One World (with Cathy McIlwaine) (Zed, 1998)
 Women-headed Households: Diversity and Dynamics in the Developing World (Macmillan, 1997, reprinted 1999)
 Women of a Lesser Cost: Female Labour, Foreign Exchange and Philippine Development (with Cathy McIlwaine) (Pluto, 1995)
 (ed.) Gender and Migration in Developing Countries (Bellhaven, 1992)
 (ed.) Routledge Major Works on Gender, Poverty and Development (4 volumes) (with Gwendolyn Beetham (Routledge, 2015)
 Women and Survival in Mexican Cities (Manchester University Press, 1991)
 Women in the Third World: Gender Issues in Rural and Urban Areas (with Lynne Brydon) (Elgar, 1989, reprinted 1993)
 Community leadership and self-help housing (Peter Ward and Sylvia Chant) (Pergamon 1987)
 Gender, Urban Development and Housing (UNDP, 1996)

References

External links
Official page at LSE

1958 births
2019 deaths
Alumni of King's College, Cambridge
Academics of the London School of Economics
British geographers
Place of birth missing
Women geographers
British women non-fiction writers